Solomon Zombo Morris (born 16 June 1990 in Freetown) is a Sierra Leonean footballer who plays as a goalkeeper for French club FUSC Bois-Guillaume.

Career
He was called up for the first time in Sierra Leone's 2013 Africa Cup of Nations qualification match against Tunisia.

In the summer 2019, Morris joined French club FUSC Bois-Guillaume.

References

External links 

1990 births
Living people
Sierra Leonean footballers
Sierra Leonean expatriate footballers
Sportspeople from Freetown
Association football goalkeepers
Sierra Leone international footballers
FC Rouen players
US Quevilly-Rouen Métropole players
FC Dieppe players
Toulouse Rodéo FC players
Championnat National players
Championnat National 2 players
Championnat National 3 players
Expatriate footballers in France